Rokas Gustys (born 22 August 1994) is a Lithuanian professional basketball player for BC Neptūnas of the Lithuanian Basketball League (LKL). Gustys has competed with the Lithuanian junior national teams on multiple occasions.

Early life and high school
Gustys was born in Kaunas, Lithuania where he went to school and played basketball until 2012. In the summer of 2012 he went to the US to study and play basketball at Oak Hill Academy where he helped lead to a 41-4 record and a number four ranking in the USA Today Sports Super 25 during the 2013-14 season, averaging 12 points and a team-high nine rebounds per game for the Warriors as a senior.

College career
Gustys had a very successful career at Hofstra University, he finished his career ranked first all-time in Hofstra’s NCAA Division I history with 1,305 rebounds. His rebounding total is second all-time in Colonial Athletic Association history to Hall of Famer David Robinson. Only the third player since 1996 to rank in the top five in the nation in rebounding in three straight seasons, joining Paul Millsap and Kenneth Faried. He totaled 1,184 career points to rank 25th all-time in program history. Gustys had 48 career double-doubles, averaged 9.9 points and 10.9 rebounds per game over his four seasons. As a senior, Gustys averaged 10.5 points and 12.0 rebounds per game.

Professional career
Gustys made his professional debut with BC Palencia signing a one year contract.
In 2019 he came back to Lithuania, signing with BC Šiauliai. On 10 March 2020, Gustys achieved a Lithuanian Basketball League record for most offensive rebounds (13). Overall, he had an impressive season, averaging 11,3 points, 6,5 rebounds, becoming one of the best center's in the 2019/20 LKL season.

On 10 July 2020, Rytas Vilnius announced a contract signing with Rokas Gustys, until 2023.

References

External links
 Hofstra Pride bio

1994 births
Living people
BC Šiauliai players
Centers (basketball)
Hofstra Pride men's basketball players
Lithuanian expatriate basketball people in Spain
Lithuanian expatriate basketball people in the United States
Lithuanian men's basketball players
Palencia Baloncesto players
BC Juventus players
Basketball players from Kaunas